Citadel is the second studio album by the Australian band Ne Obliviscaris. It was released worldwide on 7 November 2014 and November 11 in North America, marking their first release through Season of Mist records.

It is the last album to feature Brendan "Cygnus" Brown, who was released from the band in January 2017, thus marking the end of the steady line-up the band had since their first album.

Track listing

Personnel
Ne Obliviscaris
 Tim Charles – clean vocals, violin, production
 Xenoyr – harsh vocals
 Matt Klavins – guitar
 Benjamin Baret – lead guitar
 Brendan "Cygnus" Brown – bass guitar
 Daniel Presland – drums

Additional personnel
 Emma Charles – additional violins (tracks 1 and 2)
 Timothy Hennessy – cello (tracks 1, 2 and 6)
 Troy McCosker – audio engineering, production
 Jens Bogren – mixing, mastering
 Anthony Iorio – additional audio engineering
 Svartwerk – art and layout

Charts

References

Ne Obliviscaris (band) albums
2014 albums